The NAIA Wrestling Championship is the annual tournament to determine the national champions of NAIA men's collegiate wrestling in the United States and Canada. It has been held annually since 1958. The tournament consists of both a team national title and individual titles at various weight classes.

The most successful program is Grand View (IA), with eleven team NAIA national titles.

The current champion is Grand View, who won their eleventh team national title in 2023.

Champions

Team titles
List updated through the 2022 Championships

 A = Central State (OK) is now Central Oklahoma
 B = Northern Montana is now Montana State–Northen
 C = Lock Haven State is now Lock Haven
 D = Bloomsburg State is now Bloomsburg
 E = Central Washington State (OK) is now Central Washington
 F = Mankato State is now Minnesota State
 G = Moorhead State is now Minnesota State Moorhead
 H = Nebraska–Omaha now brands as Omaha

See also
 NAIA Women's Wrestling Championship
 NCAA Division I Wrestling Championships
 NCAA Division II Wrestling Championships
 NCAA Division III Wrestling Championships)

References

Wrestling
Championship
College wrestling championships